Crim3s, formerly known as Story of Isaac, is an English electronic duo from London. The group consists of Rou Rot and Sadie Pinn, who met while living in a warehouse in North London. 

They debuted with a self-titled EP on Black Bus Records in December 2011. In 2013, they self-released their second EP, Stay Ugly. They were part of the 2017's Sound of Stockholm lineup.

Biography 
Rou Rot and Sadie Pinn met in the Monkey Farm, a North London warehouse where they used to live. Rot was seeking a singer for the music he composed, and decided to work with Pinn after their first recording tries. After being evicted on short notice, they were left homeless for a period of a year: "Our first ep was made when we were homeless, each track in a different environment. We’ve written tracks in garages, railway arches, office blocks, garden sheds and a law students uni room." They made a name for themselves as organisers and DJs of illegal squat raves in London  and were described by Electronic Beats as "pure punk in the truest sense, possessed of a strong DIY spirit and a no-fucks-given attitude." Rot has cited their lifestyle as an inspiration for their name: "Being chased by police and opening buildings to squat is a funny way to live. The harsh reality of life – not just for us, but the people we see around us every day – is what our music is about, and the reason why we're called CRIM3S."

Discography

Extended plays
Crim3s (2011)
Stay Ugly (2013)

Singles
As Story of Isaac (both re-labeled as Crim3s)
"New Flesh" (2010)
"Holes" (2011)

As CRIM3S
"Still Goin" (2013)
"Militia" (2016)

Remixes
As CRIM3S

"I'm God" [by Clams Casino] (2011)
"Inferno" [by BATHAUS] (2012)
"Desire" [by Dilly Dally] (2016)

As Story Of Isaac

"Dancing in Slow Motion" [by Teenage Fantasy] (2010)
"Crimewave" [by Crystal Castles] (2010)
"Black Panther" [by Crystal Castles] (2010)
"Baptism" [by Crystal Castles] (2010)
"Hologram" [by These New Puritans] (2010)
"∞" [by PARTY TRASH, with Drugs for Drunks] (2011)
"Feather" [by White Ring] (2011)
"Sunday Best" [by You Love Her Coz She's Dead] (2011)
"Intimate" [by Crystal Castles] (2012)

Mixtapes
As CRIM3S
"SaAaAaVemEe" (2011)
"DESTROY CULTURE MIXTAPE" (2011) 
"NEW YORK S!CK MIX" (2011)
"CRIM3S SUPERSUPER! Mix" (2012)
"LOGO MIX" (2013)

As Story Of Isaac
"December Drag" (2010)
"Overdose" (2010)
"† † Haunted House † † Mix" (2010)
"Summer Drag" (2011)
"Forty Ounce Mixtape" (2011)

Videos
"Meet Me Half Dead" [directed by Zephyr Mann] (2011)
"Drawn" [directed by Crim3s] (2011)
"Lost" [directed by Oohh Mmyy Godd] (2013)

References

External links 
 Official website

English electronic music duos
Musical groups from London